Coal Miner's Daughter may refer to:

 "Coal Miner's Daughter" (song), 1969 song by Loretta Lynn
 Coal Miner's Daughter (album), 1970 album by Loretta Lynn
 Coal Miner's Daughter (film), a 1980 film about American singer Loretta Lynn
 Coal Miner's Daughter: Original Motion Picture Soundtrack, 1980 Coal Miner's Daughter film soundtrack
 Loretta Lynn: Coal Miner's Daughter, 1976 autobiography by Loretta Lynn and George Vecsey
 Coal Miner's Daughter: A Tribute to Loretta Lynn, 2010 album by various artists